Fenway station is a light rail stop on the MBTA Green Line D branch, located under Park Drive near the Riverway in the Fenway–Kenmore neighborhood of Boston, Massachusetts. It opened along with the rest of the D branch on July 4, 1959, when trolleys replaced Highland branch commuter rail service. The station is fully accessible from Park Drive via the Landmark Center parking lot, as well as from Miner Street.

Named after the Fenway parkway rather than Fenway Park, it is not the nearest station to the stadium—Lansdowne commuter rail and Kenmore Green Line station are closer. Nevertheless, it is heavily used during Boston Red Sox home games and other Fenway Park events.

Station layout

The station is located under the Park Drive overpass, with platforms stretching under the bridge and slightly to the west. A set of stairs connects the inbound platform to the bridge. Accessible sidewalks connect the inbound platform to Park Drive via the Landmark Center parking lot and to Miner Street next to the tracks. The outbound platform has no entrances of its own and is accessed via pedestrian crossings from the inbound platform.

MBTA bus routes  and  run on Park Drive, with stops on the bridge above the station. There are no crosswalks to access the southbound bus stop at the station; the nearest crosswalks are at Riverway. A $170,000 state grant awarded in December 2020 will fund an accessible crosswalk with flashing signals at the station.

History

The Boston and Worcester Railroad opened a  branch from Brookline Junction to Brookline on April 10, 1848. The Charles River Branch Railroad extended the Brookline branch to Newton Upper Falls in November 1852 and to Needham in June 1853, keeping the original B&W station for its service.

The Boston and Albany Railroad bought back the line, then part of the New York and New England Railroad, in February 1883. It was double-tracked and extended to the B&A main at Riverside; "Newton Circuit" service via the Highland branch and the main line began on May 16, 1886. No station was located at what is now Park Drive; the nearest stations were Chapel and later Longwood to the west.

In June 1957, the Massachusetts Legislature approved the purchase of the branch by the M.T.A. from the nearly-bankrupt New York Central Railroad for conversion to a trolley line. Service ended on May 31, 1958. The line was quickly converted for trolley service and reopened on July 4, 1959. All pre-1958 station locations were kept (though many station buildings were demolished for parking lots) and a new Fenway Park station was added at Park Drive.

The name of the station was criticized from the start, as it is significantly further from Fenway Park than Kenmore station. In the mid-1970s, the MBTA began calling the station Fenway after the road of the same name; however, the old name was used on some maps into the 1980s. Until the 2006 season, it remained well-trafficked by fans from Red Sox games because the MBTA did not collect fares at outbound Green Line surface stops, making the trip to Riverside free for those boarding at Fenway but not at Kenmore. At the beginning of 2007, the MBTA started collecting fares on outbound trips and the station's popularity declined. However, some fans still use the station either due to confusion or to avoid crowding at Kenmore.

In the early 2000s, the MBTA modified key surface stops with raised platforms for accessibility as part of the Light Rail Accessibility Program. The renovation of Fenway was completed around 2002. Around 2006, the MBTA added a wooden mini-high platform on the inbound side, allowing level boarding on older Type 7 LRVs. These platforms were installed at eight Green Line stations in 2006–07 as part of the settlement of Joanne Daniels-Finegold, et al. v. MBTA. In June 2007, the MBTA constructed a new siding at Fenway station to store maintenance equipment.

Fenway was a proposed stop on the Urban Ring – a circumferential bus rapid transit (BRT) line designed to connect the existing radial MBTA rail lines to reduce overcrowding in the downtown stations. Under plans released in 2008, the line would have been in a tunnel under and slightly offset from the D branch, with an underground station between Miner Street and Park Drive. The project was cancelled in 2010

In 2016, the MBTA considered adding one or two elevators to improve accessibility at the station, but it was not pursued. The stairs to Park Drive were closed on November 12, 2021 for maintenance.

References

External links

MBTA - Fenway
Park Drive entrance from Google Maps Street View

Green Line (MBTA) stations
Railway stations in Boston
Railway stations in the United States opened in 1959